PWWP domain containing 2A is a protein that in humans is encoded by the PWWP2A gene.

References

Further reading